Wickham railway station may refer to:

 West Wickham railway station, in London, England
 Wickham Bishops railway station, in Wickham Bishops, Essex, England
 Wickham railway station, New South Wales, former station in Newcastle, Australia (closed in 2014)
 Newcastle Interchange, station in Wickham, Newcastle, Australia (opened in 2017 to the west of the Wickham railway station mentioned above)
 Wickham railway station (Hampshire), in Wickham, Hampshire, England
 Wickham Market railway station, in Wickham Market, Suffolk, England